This is the official catalogue of Below Par Records. The list is ordered by release number. Original release dates are within the parentheses.

Releases

See also
 Below Par Records

Discographies of Australian record labels
Punk rock discographies